Isobel Bishop (born September 8, 1991) is an Australian water polo player.  She has earned water polo scholarships from the South Australia Institute of Sport and the Australian Institute of Sport. She plays for the Adelaide Jets in the National Water Polo League. She is a member of the Australia women's national water polo team ,and won a gold medal at the 2011 Canada Cup and another gold at the 2011 FINA Junior World Championships. She is trying to solidify a spot on the team in order to represent the country at the 2012 Summer Olympics.

Personal
Bishop was born on 8 September 1991 in Toorak Gardens, South Australia. Bishop attended Wilderness School in Adelaide, South Australia and completed her education in 2009.

Water polo
Bishop plays water polo left-handed. She first played the sport as a thirteen-year-old because her sister played the sport and it was offered at her school. She has held a water polo scholarship from the South Australia Institute of Sport and the Australian Institute of Sport. In 2008, she trained five mornings and four evenings a week while going to high school.

Club water polo
Bishop started playing water polo for the South Australian Wilderness team based at the Adelaide Aquatic Centre.  She spoke out to the press in protest of plans to make changes to a pool at the centre that would have made it shallower.  Changing the depth would have made it impossible to play water polo in it, and would have imposed a need to drive to another venue for many junior area players.

Bishop made her senior National Water Polo League debut in 2007 when she played for Adelaide Jets and was with the team for the 2011 season. She also played water polo for the Adelaide Tritons. In 2012, she played for the Victorian Tigers in the National Water Polo League.

Junior national team
Bishop has represented Australia on the junior national level. In January 2009, she was a member of the national team that competed at the Australian Youth Olympic Festival  held in Sydney.  She competed in the preliminary match against China where Australia won 17–10.  She scored two goals in the match. In July 2011, she attended a training camp with the junior national team in Perth, Western Australia. She participated in the preliminary round loss to Hungary 19–17.  In the match, she scored two goals.  She was a member of the Australian side that finished third at the 2011 FINA Junior World Championships.

Senior national team

Bishop is a member of the Australia women's national water polo team.  She had her first call up to the senior national team in December 2009. In 2010, she was a member of the national team that competed in the preliminary rounds of the FINA World League in Japan from 21 to 23 May and in China from 26 to 28 May. In 2011, she was training with the goal of making the 2012 Olympic squad. At the 2011 Canada Cup, she scored a goal in the third period in the gold medal match against China that the Australian team ended up winning. She competed in the Pan Pacific Championships in January 2012 for the Australian Stingers. In February 2012, she was named to the final training squad for the 2012 Summer Olympics.  She attended training camp that started on 20 February 2012 at the Australian Institute of Sport. The team of seventeen players will be cut to thirteen before the team departs for the Olympic games, with the announcement being made on 13 June. She was part of the Stingers squad that competed in a five-game test against Great Britain at the AIS in late February 2012.  This was the team's first matches against Great Britain's national team in six years.

See also
 List of World Aquatics Championships medalists in water polo

References

External links

 

1991 births
Living people
Australian female water polo players
Sportswomen from South Australia
Date of birth missing (living people)
World Aquatics Championships medalists in water polo
Olympic water polo players of Australia
Water polo players at the 2016 Summer Olympics